William John Gunn (12 May 1899 – 28 January 1970) was an Australian rules footballer who played with South Melbourne in the Victorian Football League (VFL).

Notes

External links 

1899 births
1970 deaths
Australian rules footballers from Victoria (Australia)
Sydney Swans players
Maryborough Football Club players